Dermod Dwyer is Executive Chairman of the Convention Centre Dublin, the Ritz- Carlton Powerscourt and Setanta Sports Broadcasting Ireland.

Career
In 1968, Dwyer began his career in the hotel and hospitality industry in Limerick. In 1981, he became president of the Irish Hotels Federation (IHF). In 1986, he became chairman of the IHF National Tourism Policy Committee.

In 1989, Dwyer graduated from Harvard University's Kennedy School of Government. The following year, he was appointed as a senior research analyst at the Taubman Centre. In 1992, he co-founded the tourism and transport consultancy, TTC International.

In 2005, he was part of the team that designed and build Ireland's National Conference Centre.

In January 2021, Dwyer announced that he was standing down as executive chairman of The Convention Centre Dublin.

Other positions
 Non-executive chairman of Setanta Sports Broadcasting Ireland since 2002 (reappointed by new shareholders in September 2009 following successful transfer of business to new ownership);
 Non-executive chairman of the Educena Foundation from 2007, Trustees of 112 secondary schools in Ireland;
 Independent Chairman of Bray Rejuvenation Committee 2006 to 2008, a Public-private partnership category winner of Chambers of Commerce of Ireland National Award and subsequently Ireland's cleanest town 
 Non-executive Governing Body member and Chairman of Development Committee of Marino Institute of Education from 2002 to 2009 ; 
 Chairman of Wicklow for Europe – Lisbon 2 Treaty referendum 
 Appointed to the Board, as Governor and Guardian, of the National Gallery of Ireland by Minister for Arts, Sport & Tourism in June 2010 
 Appointed as non-executive director to the Board of MTCI (the science Foundation Molecular Therapeutics for Cancer Ireland) .

Education
 Clongowes Wood College & the Crescent College Limerick;
 NIHE, Limerick;
 1988: Harvard University;
 2004: University College Dublin – Diploma in Corporate Governance ;
 2005: Founder Member of Corporate Governance Association of Ireland ;
 2008: Institute of Directors London – Chartered Director .

References

Irish chief executives
Living people
Harvard Kennedy School alumni
Year of birth missing (living people)